Frederick Albert Britten (November 18, 1871 – May 4, 1946) was a U.S. Representative from Illinois.

Early life
Frederick Albert Britten was born on November 18, 1871, in Chicago, Illinois. Britten attended Heald's Business College, San Francisco, California.

Britten competed in an amateur boxing tournament at the World's Columbian Exposition in 1893. He won the Pacific Coast Championship in 1892, the Central Championship at Chicago in 1893 and the Eastern Championship at Chicago in 1894.

Career
Britten was a construction worker and a business executive before his political career began. He served as member of the Chicago City Council from 1908 to 1912. He served as member and chairman of the city civil service committee in 1909. Then he served as member of the executive committee of the American group of the Interparliamentary Union from 1923 to 1934. He also served as a delegate to the Republican National Convention in 1936.

Britten was elected as a Republican to the Sixty-third and to the ten succeeding Congresses (1913–1935). On April 5, 1917, he was one of the 50 representatives who voted against declaring war on Germany. He served as chairman of the Committee on Naval Affairs from 1928 to 1931 (Seventieth and Seventy-first Congress). Britten worked to repeal the Eighteenth Amendment. He was an unsuccessful candidate for reelection to the Seventy-fourth Congress in 1934.

In 1938, he worked on an importing and exporting business in Chicago.

Personal life
Britten married Alma Hand of Weiser, Idaho on March 4, 1907.

While serving in congress, Britten and his family took up residence at the Emma S. Fitzhugh House at 2253 R Street Northwest, Washington, D.C., and continued residing there even after retiring from politics in 1935. Britten then bought the house from Emma S. Fitzhugh on June 19, 1941 and eventually sold the house to Joaquín M. Elizalde, the first ambassador of the Philippines to the United States on October 14, 1946. The house then became the official residence of Philippine ambassadors to the United States.

Death
Britten died on May 4, 1946, at Walter Reed Hospital in Bethesda, Maryland. He was interred in Abbey Mausoleum in Arlington County, Virginia. He was later reinterred in an unknown location.

References

External links
 

1871 births
1946 deaths
Chicago City Council members 
Boxers from Chicago
Heald College alumni
Republican Party members of the United States House of Representatives from Illinois
American male boxers